The Journal of Croatian Studies is a peer-reviewed academic journal published by the Croatian Academy of America. It covers the field of Croatian studies, including the history and culture of Croats and Croatia, as well as issues pertaining to American Croats and their descendants. Established as an annual publication in 1960, the journal has published over 40 volumes on an irregular schedule. 

All issues are available online from the Philosophy Documentation Center.

See also 
 History of Croatia
 Slavic studies

References

External links 
 
 Croatian Academy of America

Slavic studies journals
Publications established in 1960
Annual journals
Academic journals published by learned and professional societies
English-language journals
Philosophy Documentation Center academic journals
Irregular journals
Works about Croatia